David Cupák (born 27 May 1989 in Brno) is a Czech futsal player, currently playing for KAJOT Helas Brno. He has played professional football for 1.FC Brno.

Football career
Cupák played five games for FC Zbrojovka Brno in the Gambrinus liga.

Futsal career
Cupák represented the Czech Republic national futsal team at the FIFA Futsal World Cup 2008.
Cupák also represented the Czech Republic national futsal team at the UEFA Futsal Euro 2014 in Belgium and UEFA Futsal Euro 2016 in Serbia.

References

External links
UEFA profile

1989 births
Living people
Czech footballers
Czech First League players
FC Zbrojovka Brno players
Czech men's futsal players
Association football defenders
Sportspeople from Brno